Senator Pino may refer to:

Frank J. Pino (1909–2007), New York State Senate
Jerry Ortiz y Pino (born 1942), New Mexico Senate